The 2018–19 Togolese Championnat National is the 49th season of the Togolese Championnat National, the top-tier football league in Togo, since its establishment in 1961 following independence. The season started on 22 September 2018.

League table

Stadiums

References

Football leagues in Togo
Championnat National
Championnat National
Togo